The men's 400 metres at the 2018 World Para Athletics European Championships was held at the Friedrich-Ludwig-Jahn Sportpark in Berlin from 20 to 26 August.

Medalists

See also
List of IPC world records in athletics

References

400 metres
2018 in men's athletics
400 metres at the World Para Athletics European Championships